M&G Real Estate (formerly known as PRUPIM) is a global real estate investment manager, providing integrated services for fund management, asset management and property management. M&G Real Estate, part of M&G Investments, is the real estate investment arm of Prudential plc in the UK and Europe. M&G Real Estate is headquartered in the United Kingdom.

M&G Real Estate began its real estate investment activities in 1848, and is today one of the largest real estate investment groups in the United Kingdom. There are over 200 employees; Alex Jeffrey was appointed chief executive in July 2012.

Portfolio
M&G Real Estate owns or co-owns properties including Manchester Arndale, Finsbury Circus, Westfield Fashion Square, Westfield Garden State Plaza, Bluewater, Cribbs Causeway, and Fremlin Walk, Maidstone.

Timeline
1848: Prudential Mutual Assurance Investment and Loan Association established.
1879: Prudential moved into Holborn Bars, a purpose built office complex designed by Sir Alfred Waterhouse, now a popular architectural landmark,.

1920s / 1930s: Since equities collapsed in the Great Depression, many corporations diversified their holdings by investing heavily in property. During these years, Prudential made major real estate investments. 
1982:  The Prudential Estates department of Prudential Assurance Company, a forerunner of M&G Real Estate, became PPM Property 
2001: Prudential Portfolio Managers (PPM) was integrated with Prudential's newly acquired fund management arm M&G
2006: Prudential Property Investment Managers was formally rebranded as PRUPIM.
2013: M&G Investments changes the name of PRUPIM to M&G Real Estate

Sustainability
M&G Real Estate has been active in the sustainability movement. It achieved full ISO 14001 accreditation for its entire property portfolio.

Many other property investment companies such as Morley Fund Management, Hermes Real Estate, and AXA Real Estate Investment Managers have also implemented sustainability strategies. M&G Real Estate has reduced CO2  emissions by 14% against the 2006 baseline and has avoided the emission of 55,000 tonnes of CO2 through the purchase of green electricity;   there has been a 10% increase in water efficiency across its managed offices.

References

External links
 M&G Real Estate Home Page
 Prudential plc on Yahoo! Finance

Investment management companies of the United Kingdom
Prudential plc